Gouget is a French surname. Notable people with this name include:

Aline Gouget (born 1977), French cryptographer
Emile-Joseph-Alexandre Gouget, French sculptor with a work in La Piscine Museum
Henri Gouget, French silent film actor
 (born 1942), French politician, deputy of Lot-et-Garonne's 3rd constituency 2012–2013
 (1877–1915), French lawyer and author
Louis Gouget, French actor, in Les mutinés de l'Elseneur (1936)
Michel Gouget, French entrepreneur, founder of Arkeia Software
Pierre Gouget (1932–2003), French cyclist

See also
Jacques Gilles Henri Goguet